Chelonoidis niger phantasticus (commonly known as the Fernandina Island Galápagos tortoise or Narborough Island giant tortoise) is a subspecies of Galápagos tortoise that was discovered in 1906 and thought extinct, until a single female was discovered living on Fernandina Island by an expedition in February 2019. In May 2021, a genetic test carried out by scientists from the California Academy of Sciences confirmed that the single female tortoise discovered in 2019 is from the subspecies Chelonoidis niger phantasticus. The subspecies name has often been misspelled as phantastica, an error introduced in the 1980s when Chelonoidis was elevated to genus and mistakenly treated as feminine, an error recognized and fixed in 2017.

Taxonomy

Chelonoidis niger phantasticus is considered a subspecies of Chelonoidis niger, sometimes considered a valid species itself alongside all other subspecies. Rhodin et al. (2010) lists them separately but under the heading "C. niger species complex".

Discovery and rediscovery
 
Originally known from only one male specimen found (and killed) by members of the 1906 California Academy of Sciences expedition, there were discoveries of putative tortoise droppings and cactus bite marks in 1964 and 2013, and an unconfirmed sighting in 2009.

No confirmed live tortoises nor remains were found on Fernandina until an expedition in February 2019 discovered a potential endling, an elderly female. The tortoise was transferred to a breeding center on nearby Santa Cruz Island, for the purpose of conservation and genetic tests. There are efforts being made to find a suitable male breeding mate for the female.

The 2019 expedition was undertaken by the Galapagos National Park Directorate and Galapagos Conservancy and was led by Washington Tapia-Aguilera— Director of Conservation at the Galapagos Conservancy and director of the Giant Tortoise Restoration Initiative  —and included four rangers: Jeffreys Málaga, Eduardo Vilema, Roberto Ballesteros, and Simon Villamar. The search and discovery were shown in Forrest Galante's television show, Extinct or Alive (season 2, episode 1). While some accounts have credited Galante with the discovery, this is disputed by Tapia-Aguilera who has highlighted that "Ecuadorian park ranger Jeffreys Málaga was the one that knew the land, tracked the tortoise, and ultimately made the discovery before calling over the rest of the team."

On May 25, 2021, officials announced that genetic tests had confirmed that the female tortoise found in 2019 is indeed a member of the Chelonoidis niger phantasticus subspecies. Geneticists from Yale University in the United States compared the female's DNA with a sample extracted from the male specimen found in 1906. In 2022, the genetic findings were formally published.

The Director of the Galapagos National Park, Danny Rueda, has said that a further expedition will be launched to Fernandina Island to try to locate other members of the same subspecies.

See also
Lazarus taxon

References

Chelonoidis
Subspecies
Turtles of South America
Endemic reptiles of the Galápagos Islands
Reptiles of Ecuador
Reptiles described in 2017